is the third story arc of the manga series JoJo's Bizarre Adventure written and illustrated by Hirohiko Araki. The arc was serialized for a little over 3 years. It was serialized in Shueisha's Weekly Shōnen Jump from April 3, 1989, to April 27, 1992, for 152 chapters, which were later collected into 16 tankōbon volumes. The arc was preceded by Battle Tendency and followed by Diamond Is Unbreakable.

The story is set long after the events of Battle Tendency and follows Joseph Joestar's grandson Jotaro Kujo, a Japanese high school delinquent who awakens his own Stand, Star Platinum. Alongside his grandfather and other Stand-users, they are tasked to go on a journey to Cairo, Egypt, in order to defeat Dio, who is revealed to be alive and is seeking revenge on the Joestar family.

In 2012, Stardust Crusaders was digitally colored and released as digital downloads for smartphones and tablet computers. A ten-volume hardcover re-release under the title JoJonium was published in 2014 and 2015. Viz Media initially released the sixteen-volume format of the arc in North America between 2005 and 2010. They released the hardcover format from 2016 to 2019.

It is one of the most popular parts of the JoJo's Bizarre Adventure series as it introduced the audience to the concept of Stands, which differentiated it from its predecessors. This popularity later spawned video games, a three volume drama CD series, two novels and two OVA series of this arc alone. An anime television adaptation by David Production, JoJo's Bizarre Adventure: Stardust Crusaders, aired in Japan between April 2014 and June 2015.

Stardust Crusaders also stands out as the only arc of the series to gain any notable Western exposure prior to the release of the anime series by David Production in 2012, due to the 1993 OVA series, 1999 video game and the English releases of the manga in 2005–2010.

Plot
In Japan, 1987, Jotaro Kujo, grandson of Joseph Joestar, has been arrested, and refuses to leave his cell, believing he is possessed by an evil spirit. After being called by Holly, Joseph's daughter and Jotaro's mother, Joseph arrives with an associate, Mohammed Avdol. They explain that Jotaro's "evil spirit" is actually a manifestation of his fighting spirit, called a Stand, and reveal that they possess Stands as well. Joseph explains that the sudden appearance of their Stands is caused by the nemesis of his grandfather, Jonathan Joestar: Dio Brando, now referred to simply as Dio. Dio has survived his final battle with Jonathan by decapitating his nemesis's corpse and attaching his own head to it. Now preparing for global conquest, Dio has awoken his own Stand (which awakens the Stands of the rest of the Joestar bloodline due to his use of Jonathan's body) and recruited Stand-using assassins to kill Jonathan's remaining descendants. Soon after, Jotaro uses his Stand, which is later named Star Platinum, to defeat the first of these assassins, a transfer student named Noriaki Kakyoin, before freeing Kakyoin from Dio's control by removing a parasitic flesh bud from him. Holly soon becomes gravely ill due to a Stand manifesting in her, which is slowly killing her due to her reserved personality. With little hesitation, Jotaro, Joseph, Avdol, and Kakyoin begin a journey to Egypt to kill Dio and save Holly's life. On the way, they defeat another brainwashed assassin named Jean Pierre Polnareff who later joins the quest to kill Dio and avenge the death of his sister, whose murderer is among Dio's forces.

Forced to travel on foot after Dio's assassins manage to foil their travel by plane and ship, the group encounter Hol Horse and the murderer of Polnareff's sister, J. Geil, in Calcutta, with Avdol seemingly killed during the confrontation. Polnareff kills J. Geil with Kakyoin's help, and the remaining group travels further into Pakistan. After defeating Geil's mother, a Dio loyalist named Enya, the group reach the Red Sea, where Polnareff learns Avdol faked his death to acquire a submarine that allows them to reach Egypt.

Upon arriving in Abu Simbel, the heroes are joined by Iggy, a Boston Terrier with a Stand of his own, while facing the first of nine Stands named after Egyptian deities (rather than the tarot theme of before). Kakyoin is wounded in the fight, and is taken to a hospital to recuperate. After the group defeats several more Stand users while reaching Cairo, Iggy discovers and leads them to Dio's mansion, with Kakyoin rejoining them. At the mansion's entrance, the party is split up- Jotaro, Joseph, and Kakyoin fight the last of the nine Egyptian god Stands, while Polnareff, Avdol, and Iggy make their way through the mansion. However, one of Dio's servants, Vanilla Ice, kills Avdol and Iggy, both of whom separately sacrifice themselves to save Polnareff. An enraged Polnareff battles Vanilla Ice and discovers that Vanilla Ice has been transformed into a vampire like Dio, a fact that Vanilla Ice himself was unaware of. Polnareff floods the room with light, disintegrating Vanilla Ice and avenging his friends.

Jotaro, Joseph, Kakyoin, and Polnareff ultimately encounter Dio, and escape his mansion. A chase across Cairo follows, leading to Kakyoin confronting Dio and his Stand, The World, whose power Dio has taken great lengths to keep secret (having previously assassinated Enya to keep her from telling the heroes). Though fatally wounded by The World, Kakyoin manages to deduce the Stand's ability to stop time for five seconds and covertly relays it to Joseph in his final moments. Joseph is able to pass it on to Jotaro, but is swiftly killed by Dio, who uses his blood to increase the duration of his ability to nine seconds. With most of his allies dead and Polnareff unconscious, Jotaro is left to fight Dio alone. During the fight, both sides discover that their respective Stands are similar in both range, power, and ability, meaning that Jotaro is able to use The World's time-stopping powers as well. Jotaro first uses this ability to briefly move around while Dio has stopped time, but he learns how to stop time directly when Dio tries to crush him with a road roller. Dio attempts to kill Jotaro with one final kick, but a counterattack from Jotaro splits The World in two, killing it and Dio. Jotaro transfuses Dio's blood back into Joseph and uses Star Platinum to restart his stopped heart (an ability he'd previously used on himself while playing dead during the fight with Dio), reviving him. The two Joestars then expose Dio's corpse to the sun, destroying the vampire for good. Jotaro and Joseph bid Polnareff farewell before returning to Japan, as Holly has made a full recovery.

Characters

  is the delinquent protagonist. He uses the Stand Star Platinum, whose power is incredible strength, speed, and precision. It is later revealed that Star Platinum also has the power to stop time, which helps him during the final battle with Dio.
  is Jotaro's grandfather, and the protagonist of the previous part of the series, Battle Tendency. He uses the Stand Hermit Purple, which allows him to produce thorny purple vines that can perform predictions through electronic equipment such as Polaroid cameras or televisions (although at the cost of destroying said equipment); he can also use them to attach to buildings and swing through the air. He also still has access to the vampire-killing martial art known as Hamon, which was his primary ability in Battle Tendency, and can use Hermit Purple as wires to channel Hamon energy, which he uses in the fight with Dio to prevent the vampire from directly attacking him.
  is a fortune teller from Cairo, and an ally of Joseph and Jotaro. He uses the Stand Magician's Red, which allows him to manipulate fire.
  is a former enemy turned ally of Jotaro. Kakyoin believed himself a social outcast due to his Stand, which continued up until he met Jotaro. He uses the Stand Hierophant Green, which he can unravel into threads to enter people and control them from the inside, or perform a long-ranged attack using blasts of green energy known as Emerald Splash.
  is another former enemy turned ally of Jotaro. Polnareff joins the crew to avenge his younger sister, who was murdered by a man with two right hands. Polnareff uses the Stand Silver Chariot, which takes the form of an armored knight wielding a rapier, excelling in fast swordsmanship and close-range fighting; his Stand can shed its armor to increase its agility and speed exponentially. He can also shoot his sword but only once in the battle.
  is a Boston Terrier who uses the Stand, The Fool, which manipulates sand and dust.
  is the daughter of Joseph and the mother of Jotaro. Although most Stands are used for fighting, her unnamed Stand works against her gentle, non-violent soul, slowly making her increasingly sick. It takes on the form of vines with roses and berries.
 , the main antagonist, is a vampire who previously appeared in Phantom Blood. After being presumed dead for 100 years, he has returned from his slumber and attached his disembodied head to the decapitated corpse of his longtime foe, Jonathan Joestar. He uses the Stand The World, a high-power, short-range Stand similar to Star Platinum, which is capable of stopping time for brief intervals.
  is an old woman, who is the confidant of Dio. She uses the Stand Justice, which takes the form of a mist that takes control over anyone with an open wound, allowing Enya to control them as she would a marionette.
 is a recurring minor antagonist who nearly killed Mohammad Avdol (with the assistance of J. Geil) using his Stand Emperor, a long range Stand resembling a gun that can shoot and steer its bullets.
 is the son of Enya the Hag, and the man who murdered Polnareff's sister, prompting Polnareff to avenge her. J. Geil wields the Stand Hanged Man, a Stand that attacks others in reflections such as mirrors. Hanged Man can also jump from reflection to reflection in a ray of light.
Steely Dan is a servant of Dio who was sent to assassinate Enya to prevent her from revealing the secret of Dio's stand. he wields the stand Lovers, which is microscopic, and transfers damage done to its user to a selected target by infiltrating their brain.
Vanilla Ice is one of Dio's most loyal servants, going as far as cutting his head off to heal Dio's neck wound. He is revived as a vampire, and fights Polnareff, Iggy, and Avdol in Dio's mansion. He wields the stand Cream, which can swallow itself and turn into a spherical void of nothingness that destroys anything in its path.
Daniel J. D'Arby is a proficient gambler who wields Osiris, a stand that allows him to put people's souls in poker chips after they lose.
Telence T. D'Arby is Daniel J. D'Arby's younger brother, and a professional gamer who once even beat a person who was born with an IQ of 190. He wields the stand Atum, which allows him to read people's minds and place their souls into dolls if they lose.
  is a minor antagonist. He is a blind assassin hired by Dio and the first of the Egypt 9 Glory Gods the Joestar Group encounters upon entering Egypt, attacking them in the middle of the Sahara. N'Doul wields the Stand Geb, a long-ranged Stand made of water that N'Doul can remotely control and shape into anything to attack his foes from afar, notably as a sharp water stream able to slice flesh.

Production
Having originally planned the series as a trilogy, Araki thought to have the final confrontation set in present-day Japan. But he did not want it to be a tournament affair, which was popular in Weekly Shōnen Jump at the time, and therefore decided to make it a "road movie" inspired by Around the World in Eighty Days. He modeled Jotaro after American actor Clint Eastwood, including his poses and catchphrases. Although the author said the character might seem "rough" compared to other Jump protagonists, Jotaro fits his own image of a hero perfectly as a "loner" who does not do the right thing for attention. Araki said the character wearing his school uniform in the desert has its roots in Mitsuteru Yokoyama's Babel II, and that if he were to draw the part over again, he would base the Stands on Tetsujin 28-go. Araki originally thought of Stands as something inorganic powered by life force. When creating them he often takes inspiration from artifacts such as clothing, masks, and dolls by indigenous peoples, which when fused with something biological or mechanical, makes for a very unique design.

Araki said he had a lot of readers asking him to bring older characters back. Although he is not a fan of bringing them back simply for nostalgia, he did not hesitate having Joseph return from Battle Tendency to save his daughter because it is completely true to the character. The author thought of having Joseph drop out partway through due to his age, but ended up "playing it by ear" as serialization continued. He gave him the role of "navigator", introducing the readers to the Joestar family, Dio, Hamon and Stands, and his own Stand being a support ability rather than offensive. Stands being a succession of the Hamon and Hamon being life energy that spreads across the body through breathing, Araki thought Joseph's Hermit Purple vines wrapping around his body were a visual representation of that.

Avdol was given the role of "subleader" who acts as navigator, and, with steadfast determination and an unyielding sense of duty, he is the one in the group that everyone can rely on. Araki said he gave him an "ethnic" design to have some sort of connection to Egypt and that at the time of serialization, he and most of the readers had a strong interest in the "birthplaces of civilization," making Avdol's design a "product of the times." Not wanting readers to get complacent, the author took Avdol out of action under the guise of death. Although he intended to bring him back, he did not have specific plans and just wrote what came natural. In hindsight, Araki felt he probably should have given Avdol a section where he played a more primary role, but also believes that he would not have ranked well in a character popularity poll, as the readers only wanted more fights featuring Jotaro. Araki also said that Avdol's Stand was difficult to draw as controlling fire is a common thing in manga and film, and if you "play it too loose" it can break the power balance. As such, fire and poison are two abilities he is okay with barring from future use.

Araki stated that he had Kakyoin act as a foil to Jotaro. Although they both wear school uniforms, Kakyoin's well-tailored one gives him the feel of an honor student, while Jotaro's loose-fitting one and accessories convey that he is a delinquent. He made him Jotaro's first real Stand opponent to visually convey the concepts between short-range and long-range Stand abilities. The author revealed that he always read the kanji for Kakyoin's given name as "Tenmei," but his editor approved the reading Noriaki for the tankōbon much to his surprise.

In order to not have him overlap with Jotaro and Joseph, Polnareff was given a distinctive look and personality, which in turn made him shine on his own, with his lines standing out "for better or for worse." Because he is a versatile character who could say goofy lines or serious ones, he "needed" to make more appearances. More appearances means more fights, and because he made it through so many life-or-death situations, Araki feels that Polnareff grew the most in the story. The author used foreign models as reference for his hair, and also drew it like Rudol von Stroheim's from Battle Tendency. The character's name was inspired by those of Araki's three favorite French people, actors Alain Delon and Jean-Paul Belmondo, and musician Michel Polnareff.

With the series meant to be long-running, Araki took great care in deciding which unique Stand user to put the main cast against and when, in order to keep readers interested. He designed Strength, Ebony Devil, and Yellow Temperance so that their appearances and abilities did not overlap. But as these were all one-on-one battles, he then decided to introduce Hol Horse and J. Geil as a team. He had always planned on having Kakyoin and Polnareff switch allegiances to the good guys, but not Hol Horse. Although he drew a color illustration with Hol Horse alongside the Joestar group and had the character return several times through the story, he suspects he did not go through with it because his personality overlaps with Polnareff's. He also said that because he did not put many limitations on his Stand, it kind of got out of control, plus it overlaps with Kakyoin's Emerald Splash. He did enjoy Hol Horse's "why be number one when you can be number two" philosophy, which the author carried over to Yoshikage Kira in Diamond Is Unbreakable, and his outlaw appearance is similar to that of Gyro Zeppeli from Steel Ball Run and might have been inspired by Buichi Terasawa's Cobra.

Not having any limitations on what he can put in JoJo's Bizarre Adventure, Araki has animals appear and even had one join the Joestar party. Wanting to add an animal as a pet, he chose a dog which to him symbolizes loyalty and friendship. Contradicting what he said in an earlier volume, Araki revealed that just like with Kakyoin and Polnareff, he did not originally plan for Iggy to join the group. Although he feels that The Fool is a perfect fit for Iggy, it just happened to be the last tarot card for him to assign aside from The World. Additionally, he thought of assigning The Fool to an enemy instead, but things just "ended up working out the way they did." Being the first time he made an animal a major character and the first time he showed one in battle, Araki used Yoshihiro Takahashi's Ginga: Nagareboshi Gin as a reference. He described The Fool as representing his ideal design for a Stand; starting with a dog, then adding a Native American mask, and then the tires of a car. The third aspect was added because Weekly Shōnen Jump was sponsoring a Formula One car at the time.

Having previously done a gambling battle in his manga Cool Shock B.T., Araki wanted to do another as a Stand battle, leading to the creation of D'Arby the Elder. His Stand ability came from the author's own belief that the money and chips you gamble with in real life are a representation of your soul. Having greatly enjoyed the fight, Araki later introduced his younger brother. Looking back, he believes that the D'Arby brothers and the Oingo Boingo brothers separated JoJo's Bizarre Adventure from other manga because it allowed him to add much more variation to its battles. He also said that this led to the dice battle in Diamond Is Unbreakable and the beetle battle in JoJolion.

Enya the Hag was modeled after the scary old women from horror films and created to answer how Dio learned about Stands. Her Stand was also inspired by horror films, where an unknown virus comes from space. Her son's Stand being similar to a mummy and mermaid, again references horror movies. Enya again utilizes what Araki learned from Lisa Lisa in Battle Tendency; the supernatural basis of Stands and Hamon evens the battlefield for women and children to match up against strong men.

Araki recalled how his editor suddenly ended up in the hospital during the serialization of Jotaro and Dio's final fight. Without his valuable advice, the author said it was difficult and he started panicking as the end was approaching.

English adaptation
Viz Media began publishing an English adaptation of JoJo's Bizarre Adventure in 2005, which begins the series with the Stardust Crusaders arc, starting with the last chapter of Japanese volume 12 (moved to the beginning of volume 13). The English edition is edited by Jason Thompson, author of Manga: The Complete Guide. By December 2010, all sixteen volumes (originally Volumes 13–28) have been published.

Minor edits were made to artwork where certain scenes of animal violence were redrawn by Hirohiko Araki for the English release. Volume 3 of the English edition features a single panel of a dog being decapitated which was redrawn from an alternate angle, and Japanese volume 18 (volume 6) has several redrawn panels where a mutilated dog was changed into a large rat. Volume 19 (English volume 7) features redrawn artwork in the final chapter of the "Death 13" story arc in order to remove scenes of human feces. Any instances of real-life brand names and logos (such as drinks and automotive brands) were erased. Some names were altered for the English release, presumably for copyright reasons. The character named Devo was changed entirely, along with that of Steely Dan. Oingo and Boingo were changed to Zenyatta and Mondatta after The Police album, Zenyatta Mondatta. The first volume included a recap of Parts 1 and 2 in order to clarify story points for Western readers, while mosques in volume 15 (Japanese volume 27) were redrawn after international controversy (see below), though the latter of the two was also in recent Japanese prints.

From 2016 through 2019, as part of their ongoing publication of the series in the same hardcover format as the Japanese JoJonium edition, Viz Media released a re-edition of Stardust Crusaders with all changes to the original art reverted (excluding the aforementioned mosques).

Chapters
In the original volumization, chapter 114 is collected in volume 12, listed on the Battle Tendency page.

Original volumization / First English release

2002 release

2013 release

2014 release / Second English release

Related media
From 1992 to 1993, Stardust Crusaders was adapted into the three-volume audio drama JoJo's Bizarre Adventure, subtitled Meet Jotaro Kujo, The Death of Avdol, and Dio's World. Two light novels illustrated by Araki have been released. The first is titled JoJo's Bizarre Adventure, released on November 4, 1993 and written by Mayori Sekijima and Hiroshi Yamaguchi. Nisio Isin was one of the authors commissioned to write novels in celebration of the series' 25th anniversary. It was released on December 16, 2011 and titled JoJo's Bizarre Adventure Over Heaven.

A 13-episode OVA series, JoJo's Bizarre Adventure, was produced by Studio APPP. The first six episodes were released on VHS and Laserdisc by Pony Canyon from 1993 to 1994, covering the latter part of this arc. When the series was released on DVD by Klock Worx from 2000 to 2002, an additional set of seven episodes were produced by the same cast and crew, serving as a prequel to the earlier episodes (which were subsequently re-released with new chronological numbering). Super Techno Arts produced a North American English dub version of all 13 episodes in chronological order as a six-volume DVD series.

An anime television adaptation of the series, titled JoJo's Bizarre Adventure: Stardust Crusaders, was produced by David Production and aired in Japan between April 2014 and June 2015. The series was simulcast by Crunchyroll, with several names rewritten to avoid copyright infringement. In addition to the second season of the anime, a mobile app game titled JoJo's Bizarre Adventure: Stardust Shooters was also released.

The arc has been adapted into several video games. The first was a role-playing video game released in 1993 for the Super Famicom under the title JoJo's Bizarre Adventure,. A fighting game for arcades by Capcom, also simply titled JoJo's Bizarre Adventure, was released in 1998. It was released internationally as JoJo's Venture, and followed by an upgraded version titled JoJo's Bizarre Adventure: Heritage for the Future. The international version this time retained the manga's actual full title of JoJo's Bizarre Adventure, dropping the Heritage for the Future subtitle. The upgraded version was then ported to the PlayStation and Dreamcast in 1999, and a high-definition version was released for PlayStation Network and Xbox Live Arcade in August 2012 before being delisted in 2014. Several characters from Stardust Crusaders later appear in the crossover games JoJo's Bizarre Adventure: All Star Battle and JoJo's Bizarre Adventure: Eyes of Heaven, both published by Bandai Namco Entertainment and developed by CyberConnect2. Jotaro and Dio in particular also appear in several crossover games with other Weekly Shōnen Jump characters, such as in Jump Super Stars, Jump Ultimate Stars and most recently Jump Force.

Controversy
In May 2008, both Shueisha and Studio APPP halted manga/OVA shipments of JoJo after a complaint had been launched against them by a group of online Muslim protestors after a scene from one of the OVA's episodes features Dio reading a book depicting pages from the Qur'an. This recall affected the English-language releases as well, causing Viz Media and Shueisha to cease publication for a year. Even though the manga did not feature that specific scene, Shueisha had Araki redraw scenes that depicted characters fighting on-top, and destroying, mosques. Viz resumed publication a year later, with the eleventh volume being published on April 7, 2009, and thus their publication was continued.

Reception
In a 2018 survey of 17,000 JoJo's Bizarre Adventure fans, Stardust Crusaders was chosen as the third favorite story arc with 17.3% of the vote. Its battle between Jotaro and Dio was chosen as the favorite fight of the series.

Reviewing Stardust Crusaders for Anime News Network, Rebecca Silverman enjoyed seeing Part 2's Joseph team up with new protagonist Jotaro and was impressed that Araki was able to keep Dio out of Part 2 completely, only to bring him back for Part 3. She initially called the replacement of Hamon with Stands both understandable and a bit of a disappointment, since the "insane physical abilities and contortions" caused by the former were a large source of the fun in the first two parts. However, Silverman would go on to describe later Stand battles as exciting and creative in subsequent reviews.

Notes

References

Anime and manga controversies
Adventure anime and manga
Comics set in Egypt
Fantasy anime and manga
Fiction set in 1987
Fiction set in 1988
JoJo's Bizarre Adventure
Religious controversies in comics
Shōnen manga
Shueisha manga
Supernatural anime and manga
Tarot in fiction
Viz Media manga